Railleu is a commune in the Pyrénées-Orientales department in southern France.

Geography 
Railleu is in the canton of Les Pyrénées catalanes and in the arrondissement of Prades.

Population

See also
Communes of the Pyrénées-Orientales department

References

Communes of Pyrénées-Orientales